Rick and Morty & The Pocket Mortys in: Pocket Like You Stole It!, marketed simply as Rick and Morty – Pocket Like You Stole It and Pocket Mortys – Pocket Like You Stole It, is a limited series graphic novel, written by Tini Howard, illustrated by Marc Ellerby, and colored by Katy Farina, which was published in five parts in 2017 by Oni Press, as an adaptation of Pocket Mortys, a Pokémon-inspired free-to-play role-playing video game set in the Rick and Morty franchise by Justin Roiland and Dan Harmon. Part 1, Horrible Freedom, was released on July 5; Part 2, Collect Yourself and Move On, was released on August 16; Part 3, Crisis on Infinite Dads!, was released on September 13; Part 4, Tama-Gotchya!, was released on October 18; and Part 5, F**ck-Save!, was released on November 22 (all in 2017). Each issue of the series was published with a collection of Pocket Mortys trading cards, with characters created exclusively for the series later being made available as playable characters in the Pocket Mortys video game.

The series is notable for featuring a possible origin story for "Evil Morty", an alternate version of Morty Smith and the perennial antagonist of the first five seasons of the Rick and Morty television series, receiving a generally positive critical reception. The series' name is a reference to the Gary Clark song "Drive It Like You Stole It", from the soundtrack of the 2016 Irish coming-of-age comedy-drama film Sing Street.

Overview
Based on the same multiple timeline concept as described in the Rick and Morty first season episode "Close Rick-counters of the Rick Kind" and the video game Pocket Mortys. Pocket Like You Stole It is set in the plains surrounding the original Citadel of Ricks, where alternate 'wild' versions of Morty Smith are collected by versions of their grandfather Rick (of a human-like species of "Pocket Ricks", separate from the human Rick of the television series), who battle them against one another with a variety of 'Trainers' in the form of Ricks, one Jerry-training Beth Smith and several supporting characters, with the series following the story of Plain (later "Evil") Morty Smith of C-594 as he seeks to free all other versions of himself from servitude.

Premise

Part One: Horrible Freedom

Part Two: Collect Yourself and Move On
Morty thinks he’s hit the jackpot when he stumbles upon a secret Morty haven, run by Crazy Cat Rick. All the food and cozy body pillows he could want! But he soon discovers that there’s a dastardly reason that the Mortys are so docile, and stumbles upon the grand secret of Morty battling.

Part Three: Crisis on Infinite Dads!
Aw gee, Morty’s on his way to stop the Council of Ricks! Morty battling just isn’t right, and we’ve gotta stop it! That is, until he gets stopped by Beth, and her team of Pocket Jerries! Swimming Jerry! Wizard Jerry! Buff Jerry! They’re all here, and they’re all out to stop Morty!

Part Four: Tama-Gotchya!
CAPTURED ONCE MORE! Morty is back in Rick's clutches… but could he be an ally in the fight against the Council of Ricks? Maybe! Or maybe he just wants to see Morty fight a bunch of other Mortys on the way. We'll find out!

Part Five: F**ck-Save!

Development
In December 2016, a comic book adaptation of the Pokémon-inspired role-playing video game Pocket Mortys was announced to be in development at Oni Press, who previously published the Rick and Morty ongoing comic series. Titled Pocket Like You Stole It, the limited-run series, written by Tini Howard, illustrated by Marc Ellerby, and colored by Katy Farina, would see "cut to the bleak truth of what [Pokémon] actually means", and be released July 5, 2017 (after a free preview would be included in the Free Comic Book Day issue of Rick and Morty on May 6, 2017). Described as having "cinematic" art, with "every shot [being] full of hilarious background Mortys" inspired by Where's Wally? (in excess of 300 an issue), and named in reference to the Gary Clark song "Drive It Like You Stole It", from the soundtrack of the 2016 Irish coming-of-age comedy-drama film Sing Street, the series follows the evolution of "a plain ol’ Morty" from "our Pikachu" into (President) "Evil Morty", the perennial antagonist of the first five seasons of the Rick and Morty television series, "fight[ing] in the name of his Mortimer brethren", with each individual issue containing trading cards inspired by Magic: The Gathering.

Reception

Keenan McClelland of Geek.com complimented the "whole theme [of the series] as feel[ing] as if the world of Pokémon joined forces with Battle Royal[e", with the "jokes in PLYSI [being] just as funny as the ones in the television series, and at times more-so", and the "interactions also feel[ing] genuine and right out of the show", in particular complimenting "Howard['s] fantastic job [in] beautifully convey[ing] the characters for who they are" in writing, and Ellerby's and Farina art style as being "as solid as ever[…] all about laying low from the hunter, as if they’re retelling a bad installment from The Hunger Games". Patrick Hayes of SciFiPulse.Net similarly lauded the series, calling it a "nice twist on the beloved videogame/trading card franchise, [with] art [as] good as the series with plenty of quick visual jokes". Jesse Schedeen of IGN similarly described the series as "an enjoyable addition to Oni's growing Rick and Morty library", with the series "captur[ing] the look, feel and general sense of humor of the show while also offering a different perspective on the mobile gaming source material" Pocket Mortys, providing "a goofy but bleak little misadventure that feels worthy of the source material[…] basically Lord of the Flies mixed with the bizarre, nihilistic sense of humor the show is known for" instead of "attempt[ing] a straightforward adaptation of the game", in particular praising the characterisation of the series' main Morty as "an amusing protagonist, one who's laughably pathetic yet rendered just well enough that the reader can't help but root for him", with "the most interesting aspect of this series [being] the way [that] Rick is painted as such an overt villain".

Denis Varkov of Kanobu praised the series' writing for subverting expectations of "a comic based on a game based on a TV series" in always "find[ing] a way to surprise you", complimenting Marc Ellerby's art as "the best of the artists of the main series[,] whose style is deliberately close to what [is seen] in the [television] series. Robbie Pleasant of Multiversity Comics meanwhile complimented the evolution of Plain Morty to Evil Morty and his "violent outbreak against the [original] Council of Ricks [a]s a nice callback to the occasional outbursts the show has given Morty Prime; [that] it's clear that Tini Howard watched the show more than enough to get the little details and drives behind the characters [and their] multiple multiversal variants of most of the characters, [whom] Howard gives [l]ittle differences that help them stand apart", further praising the art of Marc Ellerby as "manag[ing] to capture the character designs and overall look of the show in comic form nicely", with Katy Farina’s color work "providing a bright, appropriately cartoon-like look to the comic", with their collectively being "some nice moments where the art really adds an impact to the story[…] really com[ing] together to create amusing moments". Pleasant further complimented the series' ending as "the perfect note to end the comic on, very true to the tone and philosophy of the series", although feeling that "overall it doesn't reach the full potential that a “Pocket Mortys” story could be.

Rebecca Henley of WomenWriteAboutComics comparatively compared the series to writer Tini Howard's previous miniseries Mighty Morphin’ Power Rangers: Pink from Boom! Studios, with both series "really indulged a fan’s need to just see the [characters] do cool stuff." Further, Henley expanded that "loath as I am to be a reviewer swayed by references, I love how this comic decided that if putting Mortys in Pokémon were fun, seeing them in other caretaking games must be equally fun[:] Mortys in Neko Atsume[,] Mortys in Farmville [and] a hand-held Tamagotchi, praising artist Marc Ellerby's "big-eyed, colorful Mortys" and colorist Katy Farina for "mak[ing] the art pop while having enough desaturation not to seem overly cute", concluding the series to be "an entertaining graphic novel [that] plays around with the concept of the video game [Pocket Mortys] without just replicating it, [and] has a lot of cool riffs on other mobile/casual games[…] just on the side of Rick and Morty’s sick sense of humor without getting too bleak, [with] art [that] is unique but works for the series". A. Corentin of Just Focus praised the "visual humor" and "very funny" situations of the series, and how "the authors manage[d] to make the reader laugh on every page" and embracing the "atmosphere" of the Rick and Morty television series.

Collected editions

References

External links
 Rick and Morty – Pocket Like You Stole It at Oni Press

2017 graphic novels
You Stole It, Pocket Like
Oni Press titles
Prequel comics
Pokémon video games
Works based on Pokémon